Ana Isabel Alonso Gómez (born 11 November 1964 in Barakaldo, Biscay, Spain), better known as Anabel Alonso, is a Spanish actress and comedian who has appeared in theatre plays, movies and television shows, including the popular sitcom 7 Vidas and the animated film Finding Nemo (as the voice of Dory). She also hosted several different television programs.

Main roles

Her best known role is arguably playing Diana Freire in the popular Spanish sitcom 7 Vidas, loosely based on the American sitcom Friends.  In it, she played a naive second-rate actress that as time passes comes to realize her lesbianism. The portrayal of a lesbian character going against conventional stereotypes in prime time television led to Alonso becoming a gay icon. As 7 Vidas was a show known for introducing current (mostly Spanish-related, but not exclusively) topics in a comedy key, the character of Diana dealt with issues such as same-sex marriage or adoption by same-sex couples (including a powerful speech in one episode against people who reject gay adoption). Diana came across as a funny, klutzy, very sexual character, and was one of the longest-standing characters of the show.

Another well-known role of Alonso is her successful portrayal of the fish Dory in the European Spanish-language version of the movie Finding Nemo, for which she received rave reviews. She reprised her role in Finding Dory (2016).

Her father died on 28 February 2015 at the age of 89 while she was working on El Eunuco. In 2018 she replaced Silvia Abril during season 3 episode 14 in the TV program Cero en Historia.

Selected filmography
1991 
 
1993
Kika
Tretas de mujer
1994
Amor propio
La leyenda de la doncella
Los hombres siempre mienten
1995
La boutique del llanto
Las cosas del querer II
Hotel y domicilio
Boca a boca
1996
Corazón loco
Pon un hombre en tu vida
Tu nombre envenena mis sueños
Los moños
El crimen del cine Oriente
Esposados (short movie)
1999
La mujer más fea del mundo
Camino de Santiago
2000 - Carne de gallina
2002 - Historia de un búho (short movie)
2003 - Finding Nemo (voice of Dory)
2007 - Ángeles S.A. Simona
 2019 - Padre no hay más que uno as Directora

Theatre plays
Las troyanas (1984)
Maribel y la extraña familia (1990)
El lunático (1992)
Los gatos (1992)
Frankie y Johnny en el Clair de Lune (1997)
Androcles y el león (1998)
Un día cualquiera (1998)
Confesiones de mujeres de 30 (2002–2003)

Television shows
La bola de cristal (1989)
Primera función (1990)
Venga el 91 (1990)
Menos lobos (1992)
Objetivo indiscreto (1992–1993)
Habitación 503 (1993)
El peor programa de la semana (1993)
Los ladrones van a la oficina (1993)
Contigo pan y cebolla (1997)
El flechazo (1997)
Mira quién viene esta noche (1997)
Hermanas (1998)
Un país maravilloso (1999)
Secretos de Hollywood (1999)
El camino de Santiago (1999)
Condenadas a entenderse (1999)
7 Vidas (2000–2006)
Estoy por ti (2005)
Tal para cual (2006)
Pelopicopata (2006)
Distracción fatal (2006)
La familia Mata (since 2007)
Drag Race España (2022)

Awards
 Fotograma de Plata Award in 1993 for Best TV Actress for Los ladrones van a la oficina.
 Primera Línea Award in 1993 for Revelation Actress for Kika.
  Best Actress Award in 1996 from the Movie Festival of Badajoz for Esposados.
 El Mundo Award for Best Basque Actress in 1998 for El crimen del cine Oriente.
Best Actress Award from the Elche Independent Movie Festival in 2002 for Historia de un búho.
 Shan Gay magazine Award in 2002 for 7 vidas
Fotogramas de Plata Award in 2003 for Best Theatre Actress for Confesiones de mujeres de 30
Festival LesCaiCineMad'03 Best Actress Award for 7 vidas
Telón de Oro Chivas in 2004 for Best Veteran Comedy Theatre actress for Confesiones de mujeres de 30
 Fotogramas de Plata Award-Nomination in 2004 for 7 vidas.
 Academia de Televisión Española Award-Nomination in 2004 and 2006 for 7 vidas.

References

External links

1964 births
Living people
Actresses from the Basque Country (autonomous community)
Spanish television presenters
Spanish film actresses
Spanish stage actresses
Spanish television actresses
Spanish women television presenters
20th-century Spanish actresses
21st-century Spanish actresses
People from Barakaldo